The 2011–12 USC Trojans men's basketball team represented the University of Southern California during the 2011–12 NCAA Division I men's basketball season. The Trojans, led by third year head coach Kevin O'Neill, played their home games at the Galen Center and were members of the Pac-12 Conference. They finished with a record of 6-26 overall, 1-17 in Pac-12 play and lost in the first round of the 2012 Pac-12 Conference men's basketball tournament by UCLA.

Roster

2011–12 Schedule and results
 
|-
!colspan=9| Regular season

|-
!colspan=9| Pac-12 tournament

References

Usc
USC Trojans men's basketball seasons
USC Trojans
USC Trojans